Latin for Lovers was a Doris Day album, mostly composed of songs originating in Latin America, released by Columbia Records on March 22, 1965 as a monophonic LP (catalog number CL-2310) and a stereophonic album (catalog number CS-9110).

Although "Fly Me to the Moon" was not of Latin-American origin, it was an early song adapted to the bossa nova dance then becoming popular, and so associated at the time with Latin America.

A Columbia 45 r.p.m. single. #4-43278, was released to coincide with the album. It featured "How Insensitive" as the a-side and "Meditation" as the b-side. Neither song charted.

The songs were arranged by Mort Garson, who also conducted the orchestra.

The album was reissued in 2001, combined with Doris Day's Sentimental Journey, as a CD.

Track listing
"Corcovado" (Antônio Carlos Jobim, Gene Lees) (recorded November 2, 1964) - 2:54
"Fly Me to the Moon (In Other Words)" (Bart Howard) (recorded November 5, 1964) - 2:33
"Meditation"(Antônio Carlos Jobim, Newton Mendonça, Norman Gimbel) (recorded November 2, 1964) - 2:54
"Dansero" (Richard Hayman, Lee Daniels, Sol Parker) (recorded November 9, 1964) - 2:22
"Summer Has Gone" (Gene DiNovi, Bill Comstock) (recorded November 2, 1964) - 2:16
"How Insensitive" (Antônio Carlos Jobim, Vinícius de Moraes, Norman Gimbel) (recorded November 9, 1964) - 3:39
"Slightly Out of Tune (Desafinado)" (Antônio Carlos Jobim, Newton Mendonça, Jon Hendricks, Jesse Cavanagh) (recorded November 2, 1964) - 2:49
"Our Day Will Come" (Mort Garson, Bob Hilliard) (recorded November 5, 1964) - 2:40
"Be True to Me (Sabor A Mi)" (Mel Mitchell, Alarcon Carillo) (recorded November 5, 1964) - 3:04
"Perhaps, Perhaps, Perhaps (Quizás, Quizás, Quizás)" (Osvaldo Farrés, Joe Davis) (recorded November 5, 1964) - 2:31
"Be Mine Tonight (Noche De Ronda)" (Maria Teresa Lara, Sunny Skylar) (recorded November 9, 1964) - 3:22
"Por Favor" (Joe Sherman, Noel Sherman) (recorded November 9, 1964) - 2:22

References

1965 albums
Doris Day albums
Columbia Records albums
Albums arranged by Mort Garson
Albums conducted by Mort Garson
Covers albums